Bethania is a suburb in the City of Logan, Queensland, Australia.

Geography 
. Bethania lies south of the Logan River. The lower lying areas near the river occasionally suffer floods.

Bethania is situated on the main Beenleigh railway line and the suburb is served by Bethania railway station.

It has been out of commission since August 2004.

History

Bethania was founded by Germans during the 1860s and is home to many different nationalities.  By 1866 a small township had developed. It is believed the name is derived from Bethany, the biblical village in Israel.

A Lutheran church was built in 1864 made from slabs on what is now the railway line. A cemetery was established beside the church with graves from 1866. In 1872 the present church was built close to the first church. The road to the church became known as Church Road.

The first railway bridge was destroyed by flood in 1887.  A new concrete, steel and timber bridge lasted until 1972 when it was replaced by a pre-stressed concrete bridge.

The suburb was affected badly by the 1974 Brisbane flood. Duck Island became part of the suburb when part of the river was silted up.  Sand and gravel has been mined from the alluvial deposits in recent years.

Bethania Lutheran Primary School opened on 27 January 1976.

Demographics
The median age of the Bethania population was 41 years, 4 years above the national median of 37.  68.7% of people living in Bethania were born in Australia. The other top responses for country of birth were England 6.6%, New Zealand 6%, Scotland 1.4%, Philippines 0.9%, Germany 0.9%.  86.9% of people spoke only English at home; the next most common languages were 0.8% Spanish, 0.5% German, 0.5% Hindi, 0.4% Tagalog, 0.3% Samoan.

Heritage listing
Bethania has a number of heritage-listed sites, including:

 Church Road: Bethania Lutheran Church

Education 
Bethania Lutheran Primary School is a private primary (Prep-6) school for boys and girls at 66 Glastonbury Drive. In 2018, the school had an enrolment of 287 students with 25 teachers (21 full-time equivalent) and 16 non-teaching staff (11 full-time equivalent).

Amenities 
Palm Lake Christian Fellowship conduct their services at the Palm Lake Resort at 43 Goodooga Drive; it is part of the Wesleyan Methodist Church.

Transport 
Bethania railway station provides access to regular Queensland Rail City network services to Brisbane and Beenleigh.

References

External links

 

 

Suburbs of Logan City